Edwin Rolando Tenorio Montaño (born 16 June 1976) is a retired Ecuadorian football midfielder.

Club career
Before playing for his current club, Tenorio played for Sociedad Deportiva Aucas, Barcelona Sporting Club and LDU Quito where he was part of the squad that won the 2007 league championship. On June 26, 2009 he signed for Colombian club Deportivo Pereira.

International career
Between 1998 and 2007 he won 78 caps for Ecuador and was called up to the squad to participate in the 2002 FIFA World Cup and the 2006 World Cup. In both tournaments, he formed part of the starting line up. He was named deputy captain for the national side in an August 2006 friendly against South American rivals, Peru. The game ended in a 1–1 draw. He made his debut for the national squad on October 14, 1998 with a loss (1–5) in a friendly against Brazil.

Tenorio is known for his combative spirit on and off the field. While he never scored for the senior team, he has displayed on occasion a tremendously powerful shot and set up a few goals for his offensive teammates.

Tenorio was the first choice defensive midfielder for Ecuador in the 2002 FIFA World Cup in Japan-Korea and 2006 FIFA World Cup in Germany. In Germany, he formed an impressive defensive midfielder partnership with Segundo Castillo, helping Ecuador make it to the Round of 16. He also participated in Copa América 2001, 2004 and 2007.

Tenorio will now coach the Canal FC league in San Rafael, California.

External links
 
 Profile at BDFA

References

1976 births
Living people
Sportspeople from Esmeraldas, Ecuador
Association football midfielders
Ecuadorian footballers
Ecuadorian Serie A players
Categoría Primera A players
S.D. Aucas footballers
C.D. Jorge Wilstermann players
C.D. Veracruz footballers
Barcelona S.C. footballers
L.D.U. Quito footballers
S.D. Quito footballers
Deportivo Pereira footballers
Imbabura S.C. footballers
Ecuadorian expatriate footballers
Expatriate footballers in Colombia
Expatriate footballers in Bolivia
Expatriate footballers in Mexico
Ecuador international footballers
2001 Copa América players
2002 FIFA World Cup players
2002 CONCACAF Gold Cup players
2004 Copa América players
2006 FIFA World Cup players
2007 Copa América players